Vytautas Karvelis (born 1 April 1972) is a retired Lithuanian football striker.

References

1972 births
Living people
Lithuanian footballers
FK Žalgiris players
Fehérvár FC players
FBK Kaunas footballers
Shenzhen F.C. players
KSZO Ostrowiec Świętokrzyski players
Hapoel Tzafririm Holon F.C. players
FK Vėtra players
A Lyga players
Nemzeti Bajnokság I players
Chinese Super League players
I liga players
Israeli Premier League players
Association football forwards
Lithuanian expatriate footballers
Expatriate footballers in Hungary
Lithuanian expatriate sportspeople in Hungary
Expatriate footballers in China
Lithuanian expatriate sportspeople in China
Expatriate footballers in Poland
Lithuanian expatriate sportspeople in Poland
Expatriate footballers in Israel
Lithuanian expatriate sportspeople in Israel
Lithuania international footballers